Route 41 is a  scenic state highway in rural Northwestern Connecticut. It extends from the New York state line in Sharon to the Massachusetts state line in Salisbury and is the only state-numbered route in Connecticut that has both its ends at a state border.

Route description 

Route 41 begins as Amenia Union Road at a junction with Dutchess County Route 2 in the hamlet of Amenia Union at the New York state line in the town of Sharon. Route 41 proceeds north for  towards the Sharon Country Club, veering to the east then back north, becoming South Main Street. In the town center of Sharon, Route 41 intersects with Route 343 and Route 4, becoming Main Street north of the junction. After leaving the town center, the road becomes Gay Street, running for another  to the Salisbury town line.

Upon entering Salisbury, the road name changes to Sharon Road as it heads for another  towards the village of Lakeville. Along the way, it intersects with Route 112 just south of Wononskopomuc Lake. In Lakeville, Route 41 begins a  overlap with U.S. Route 44 (Main Street), as the road heads into the town center of Salisbury. In Salisbury center, Route 41 splits off from Route 44 along Under Mountain Road. The road continues across the state line as Massachusetts Route 41.

Connecticut designates various sections of its rural highways as scenic roads. The scenic designation not only encourages sightseeing but also prevents certain developments alongside and on the road itself that would alter its appearance, including rerouting and widening. In July 1990, a four-mile (6 km) section through the town center of Sharon, between Boland Road and Cole Road, was designated as a scenic road. In October 1992, the scenic designation was extended an additional  to cover the length of the route within the town of Sharon. The following year, the town of Salisbury applied for and received approval for a scenic designation for its portion of Route 41, which resulted in the entire length of Route 41 being designated a scenic route.

History 

The portion of Route 41 north of modern Route 343 was part of the 1920s New England Interstate Route 4. The portion south of Route 343 was originally a secondary state highway designated as Highway 360. In 1926, New England Route 4 was designated by AASHO as U.S. Route 7. By 1928, however, US 7 was relocated to its modern alignment. In the 1932 state highway renumbering, modern Route 41 was established from part of old New England Route 4 and old State Highway 360. No significant changes to the route have been made since.

Junction list

References

External links 

041
Transportation in Litchfield County, Connecticut
Sharon, Connecticut
Salisbury, Connecticut
U.S. Route 7